Glen Dale is a city in Marshall County, West Virginia, United States, along the Ohio River. It is part of the Wheeling, West Virginia Metropolitan Statistical Area. The population was 1,514 at the 2020 census. Glen Dale was incorporated in 1924. It is in the northwest part of the county, which is above the Mason–Dixon line and forms the base of the Northern Panhandle of West Virginia.

Geography
Glen Dale is located at  (39.948594, -80.754922).

Demographics

2010 census
As of the census of 2010, there were 1,526 people, 688 households and 475 families living in the city. The racial makeup of the city was 97.5% White, 0.1% African American, 0.5% Native American, 0.4% Asian, 0.4% from other races, and 1.0% from two or more races. Hispanic or Latino of any race were 1.0% of the population.

There were 688 households, of which 23.1% had children under the age of 18 living with them, 52.6% were married couples living together, 11.6% had a female householder with no husband present, 4.8% had a male householder with no wife present, and 31.0% were non-families. 28.1% of all households were made up of individuals, and 14.5% had someone living alone who was 65 years of age or older. The average household size was 2.22 and the average family size was 2.65.

The median age in the city was 50 years. 17.1% of residents were under the age of 18; 6.7% were between the ages of 18 and 24; 19.3% were from 25 to 44; 33.8% were from 45 to 64; and 23.1% were 65 years of age or older. The gender makeup of the city was 46.9% male and 53.1% female.

2000 census
As of the census of 2000, there were 1,552 people, 697 households and 469 families living in the city. The population density was 1,940.8 per square mile (749.0/km2). There were 757 housing units at an average density of 946.6 per square mile (365.3/km2). The racial makeup of the city was 98.65% White, 1.96% African American, 0.32% Asian, 0.26% from other races, and 0.71% from two or more races. Hispanic or Latino of any race were 0.08% of the population.

There were 697 households, of which 24.1% had children under the age of 18 living with them, 56.7% were married couples living together, 9.0% had a female householder with no husband present, and 32.6% were non-families. 30.4% of all households were made up of individuals, and 18.7% had someone living alone who was 65 years of age or older. The average household size was 2.23 and the average family size was 2.75.

In the town the population was spread out, with 19.3% under the age of 18, 5.9% from 18 to 24, 23.0% from 25 to 44, 28.1% from 45 to 64, and 23.7% who were 65 years of age or older. The median age was 46 years. For every 100 females, there were 87.7 males. For every 100 females age 18 and over, there were 83.6 males.

The median income for a household in the town was $40,000, and the median income for a family was $49,306. Males had a median income of $40,352 versus $25,588 for females. The per capita income for the city was $24,409. About 5.4% of families and 6.5% of the population were below the poverty line, including 6.9% of those under age 18 and 9.6% of those age 65 or over.

History
The community was named after Glendale, the farm of a local family.

Notable people

Glen Dale is the home town of: 
Brad Paisley, country music singer
Lionel Cartwright, country music singer
Shelley Moore Capito, United States Senator
Arch A. Moore, Jr, former Governor of West Virginia
Shelley Riley Moore, former First Lady of West Virginia
George Brett, member of Baseball Hall of Fame, born in Glen Dale, primarily raised in Southern California
Jeffrey V. Kessler, West Virginia State Senator (November 1997–2017); West Virginia Senate President (January 2011–2015)
Bernice E. Eddy, virologist and epidemiologist
Josh Pastner, college basketball coach at Georgia Tech

See also
Cockayne Farm Preservation Project

References

External links
Official website 

Cities in Marshall County, West Virginia
West Virginia populated places on the Ohio River
Cities in West Virginia